SPR Pogoń Szczecin is a women's handball club from Szczecin, Poland.

History
After the 2018–19 season, it was decided to liquidate the club. The continuation of Pogoń Szczecin was undertaken by MKS Kusy Szczecin, which in the following season started playing in the 2nd league. In 2021, the team won promotion to the I liga, and the name SPR Pogoń Szczecin was restored.

Results

National
Polish First Division:
Winners (3): 1983, 1986, 1991 
Runners-Up (5): 1971, 1984, 1989, 1990, 2016
Polish Women's Cup:
Winners (3): 1971, 1986, 1992

European record

References

External links
 Official website
 EHF Profile

Pogoń Szczecin
Polish handball clubs
1949 establishments in Poland
Handball clubs established in 1949